The 2006 NFL Europe season was the 14th season of the league and second to last.

World Bowl XIV

Frankfurt Galaxy 22-7 Amsterdam Admirals
Saturday, May 27, 2006 LTU arena Düsseldorf, Germany

References
2006 season

 
2006 in American football
NFL Europe (WLAF) seasons